Harry Matthews (born July 23, 1876 in Newport, Kentucky) was a baseball coach.

Matthews coached for the Cleveland Indians in 1926 and 1927, and for the New York Yankees in 1929.

External links

New York Yankees coaches
1876 births
Year of death missing